Mara Katherine Abbott (born November 14, 1985) is a US former professional women's bicycle racer. In 2010, Abbott became the first US cyclist ever to win the Giro Donne, one of the Grand Tours of women's bicycle racing. Abbott retired after the 2016 Olympic Games road race.

Early life and amateur career
Abbott was born in and, as of 2016, still lives in Boulder, Colorado. She was a competitive swimmer, primarily specializing in distance freestyle races, at Whitman College, which is where she took up road bicycle racing as a springtime activity.  After competing for Whitman in two straight National College Cycling Association Division II championships, where the team won back-to-back championships in both the team time trial and the team omnium, and Abbott won back-to-back championships in the road race and also won the criterium and the individual omnium in 2006, Abbott placed fifth in the USA National Championship Women's Road Race.  She also won back-to-back championships in the Mount Evans Hill Climb in 2005 and 2006.

Professional career
Abbott turned professional in 2007 and joined the Webcor Builders team.  In addition to a repeat of her college successes, she won one stage and the overall title in the Tour of the Gila and the 2007 National Cycling Championships women's road race championship, defeating former champions Kristin Armstrong and Amber Neben in a sprint to the finish.  She also continued to swim for Whitman in the fall and graduated with a degree in economics from Whitman.

Abbott joined the HTC-Columbia Women's Team in 2008 and began to excel in European races, winning a mountain stage in the Giro della Toscana.  The next year, she won stage 3 and the King of the Mountains jersey in the Giro Donne, finishing second overall.  In 2010, Abbott joined the Peanut Butter & Co. TWENTY12 team and repeated her victories at the Tour of the Gila and the USA National Championship Women's Road Race.  She won two more stages and the overall championship at the Giro Donne, which was the only women's Grand Tour event held in 2010.  That same month, she won one stage and the overall title at the Cascade Cycling Classic.  She also won one stage and finished second in the Tour de l'Aude Cycliste Féminin.

For 2011, Abbott moved to the Diadora-Pasta Zara-Manhattan team.  She won one stage and finished second overall in the Tour of the Gila, behind 1996 Canadian Olympic medalist Clara Hughes.

In 2013, Abbott won her second Giro Rosa. Later that season it was announced that she would join the new UnitedHealthcare Women’s Team in 2014.

On October 7, 2014,  announced that Abbott had signed with them for the 2015 season.

Off the bike
In addition to cycling, Abbott is a yoga instructor.
She is a freelance writer published in the Daily Camera in Boulder, Colorado as well as the Wall Street Journal and espnW. As of March 2021, she works for Ceres, a sustainability organization based in Boston.

Major results
Source:

2005
 3rd Road race, National Under-23 Road Championships
2006
 3rd Overall Mount Hood Classic
2007
 1st  Road race, National Road Championships
 1st  Overall Tour of the Gila
1st Stage 2
 2nd Overall Redlands Bicycle Classic
1st Mountains classification
1st Stage 1
 2nd Overall Nature Valley Grand Prix
 2nd Overall International Tour de Toona
1st Stage 1
 2nd Montréal World Cup
 8th Overall La Route de France
 9th Overall Giro della Toscana Int. Femminile – Memorial Michela Fanini
2008
 1st Stage 4 Mount Hood Classic
 1st Stage 1 Tour de Feminin-Krásná Lípa
 2nd Time trial, National Road Championships
 2nd Overall Redlands Bicycle Classic
1st Prologue
 2nd Overall Giro del Trentino Alto Adige-Südtirol
1st Young rider classification
 3rd Overall San Dimas Stage Race
1st Stage 1
 4th Overall Gracia–Orlová
 7th Overall Giro della Toscana
1st Stages 1 (TTT) & 3
2009
 2nd Overall San Dimas Stage Race
1st Stage 1
 2nd Overall Giro d'Italia Femminile
1st  Mountains classification
1st Stage 3
 3rd Overall Iurreta-Emakumeen Bira
 3rd Boulder Criterium
 4th Overall Redlands Bicycle Classic
 4th Durango-Durango Emakumeen Saria
 7th Overall Giro del Trentino Alto Adige-Südtirol
 7th La Flèche Wallonne Féminine
 8th Overall Giro della Toscana
 10th Grand Prix Elsy Jacobs
2010
 National Road Championships
1st  Road race
3rd Time trial
 1st  Overall Giro d'Italia Femminile
1st Stages 8 & 9
 1st Overall Cascade Cycling Classic
1st Stage 3
 1st  Overall Tour of the Gila
1st Stage 1
 2nd Overall San Dimas Stage Race
1st Stage 1
 2nd Overall Tour de l'Aude Cycliste Féminin
1st Stage 4
 6th Overall Redlands Bicycle Classic
2011
 2nd Overall Tour of the Gila
1st Stage 1
 10th Overall Giro d'Italia Femminile
2013
 1st Overall San Dimas Stage Race
1st Stage 1
 1st  Overall Tour of the Gila
1st Stages 1 & 5
 1st  Overall Giro d'Italia Femminile
1st  Mountains classification
1st Stages 5 & 6
 1st Stage 3 Redlands Bicycle Classic
 3rd Overall Cascade Cycling Classic
 5th Philadelphia Cycling Classic
2014
 1st  Overall Vuelta a El Salvador
1st Stage 4
 1st  Overall Tour of the Gila
1st Stages 1 & 5
 1st Grand Prix de Oriente
 3rd Grand Prix GSB
 3rd Grand Prix el Salvador
 4th Overall Giro d'Italia Femminile
 7th Philadelphia Cycling Classic
2015
 1st  Overall Redlands Bicycle Classic
1st Stage 3
 1st  Overall Tour of the Gila
1st Mountains classification
1st Stages 1 & 5
 2nd Overall Giro d'Italia Femminile
1st Stage 9
2016
 1st  Overall Tour of the Gila
1st Mountains classification
1st Stages 1 & 5
 1st  Mountains classification Tour of California
 4th Road race, Summer Olympics
 5th Overall Giro d'Italia Femminile
1st Stage 5

References

External links

 
 
 

1985 births
Living people
American female cyclists
American cycling road race champions
Sportspeople from Boulder, Colorado
Whitman College alumni
Cyclists at the 2016 Summer Olympics
Olympic cyclists of the United States
21st-century American women
Cyclists from Colorado